Backyard Hockey is an ice hockey video games series created by Humongous Entertainment and Mistic Software that was published by Atari and Infogrames. It was first released in October 2002 for Microsoft Windows. Additional titles were released for the Game Boy Advance and Nintendo DS. A total of four Backyard Hockey games have been released, and these include the original Backyard Hockey, Backyard Hockey 2005, Backyard Hockey for Game Boy Advance, and Backyard Hockey for Nintendo DS. The original and updated computer releases of Backyard Hockey were developed solely by Humongous Entertainment, but the two Hockey games for Nintendo handhelds were co-developed with Mistic Software.  The fourth and final installment on Nintendo DS is regarded to be the first hockey video game released in North America for such platform.

In a similar fashion to other titles in the Backyard Sports series, players create their own teams choosing from more than 30 "neighborhood kids" who each have their own unique strengths and weaknesses. Players may also choose from several National Hockey League hockey players as children, some of these players are Steve Yzerman, Mike Modano, Joe Sakic, Jaromír Jágr, Jarome Iginla, Martin Brodeur, and Curtis Joseph.

In the game players control their character in a game of ice hockey. At random times during a game, power ups appear at center ice. Power ups provide help to the team that secures them such as causing all the players on the opposing team to fall over, or super speed. Unique from most ice hockey games, fighting is not allowed in Backyard Hockey and very few penalties are called.

Installments

References 

Humongous Entertainment games
Atari games
Game Boy Advance-only games
Game Boy Advance games
Infogrames games
Ice hockey video games
Video games developed in Canada
Video games developed in the United States
Video game franchises
Video game franchises introduced in 2002
Windows games
Windows-only games